Nazko Lake Provincial Park is a provincial park in British Columbia, Canada. It is located at Nazko Lake on the Nazko River.

External links

Geography of the Chilcotin
Provincial parks of British Columbia
1995 establishments in British Columbia
Protected areas established in 1995